The Stadium Series is one of the series of regular season outdoor games played in the National Hockey League (NHL). This event is distinct from the NHL's other two series of outdoor games, the NHL Winter Classic and NHL Heritage Classic outdoor games, played on New Year's Day and in Canada, respectively. Games in the Stadium Series have been held in either late January, February, or early March in a football or baseball stadium in the United States. The first Stadium Series was held in 2014 and consisted of seven teams participating in four games held in three venues. In 2015, only one game in the Stadium Series was held, while in 2016, two games were held. Since 2017, only one game has been scheduled per year.

List of games

Bolded teams denote winners
Italicized games are yet to be played

Broadcasters

United States
In the United States, the Stadium Series was broadcast on NBC Sports from 2014 to 2020, as they held the U.S. national NHL rights during that period. NBC aired the majority of the Stadium Series games on Saturday nights; the exceptions being the 2014 Ducks–Kings game in Dodger Stadium (aired on NBCSN), the 2014 Islanders–Rangers game in Yankee Stadium (held on Wednesday night on NBCSN), and the 2015 Kings–Sharks game in Levi's Stadium (aired on NBCSN).

The 2022 game aired on TNT, marking a return to cable television for the first time since 2015. Even though ABC has its own NHL Game of the Week package on Saturdays starting that year, they cannot broadcast the Stadium Series in 2022 due to conflicts with its NBA coverage. With TNT airing NBA All-Star Saturday Night the same night, the 2023 game was broadcast on ABC.

Canada
In Canada, the first two 2014 Stadium Series games were aired on CBC, while TSN simulcast NBCSN's broadcast of the Islanders–Rangers game. The Penguins–Blackhawks game did not air in Canada due to CBC's prior commitment to broadcast a Canadiens–Maple Leafs game. Before the 2014–15 season, Sportsnet became the sole rightsholder of NHL national games in Canada, taking over Hockey Night in Canada in a sublicensing agreement with CBC. However, with the exception of the 2015 game in Santa Clara, Sportsnet has generally aired the Stadium Series using a simulcast of the American broadcasters. They would, however, provide their own broadcast crews if a Canadian team is involved, as was the case in 2018 with the Maple Leafs–Capitals game.

References 

 
NHL outdoor games
2014 establishments in the United States
Recurring sporting events established in 2014